The 1985 Torneo Descentralizado, the top category of Peruvian football, was played by 30 teams. The national champion was Universitario.

Format
The national championship was divided into two tournaments; the Torneo Regional and Torneo Descentralizado. The winners of each tournament faced off in the season final and received the berths for the 1986 Copa Libertadores. The Torneo Regional divided the teams into four groups; Metropolitan, North, Central, and South. Each group had its teams advance to the Liguilla Regional, the Torneo Descentralizado and the División Intermedia. The Liguilla Regional determined the Regional champion which advanced to the Descentralizado with a bonus point. The Descentralizado, consisting of 16 teams from the Torneo Regional, had each team play the others twice (a double round robin system) for a total of 30 games. The team that placed last in this tournament played a relegation playoff. The División Intermedia was a promotion/relegation tournament between first and second division teams. Teams received two points for a win and one point for a draw. No points were awarded for a loss.

Teams

Torneo Regional

Metropolitan

North

Central

South

Qualification playoff

Liguilla Regional
Numbers in parentheses indicate penalty shootout result. The Regional winner qualified to the 1986 Copa Libertadores and advanced to the Final of the season. Alianza Lima received a bye to the semi-finals as the Metropolitan zone winner.

Torneo Descentralizado

First stage

Liguilla

Relegation play-off

Alfonso Ugarte remain in the Primera División.

Season final
Universitario won both tournaments and became the 1985 season champion.

External links
RSSSF Peru 1985

 

1985
Peru
Torneo Descentralizado, 1985